Alexander Paton (13 August 1869 – 1935) was a Scottish footballer who played in the Football League for Bolton Wanderers in the 1890s as a right half; he featured for the club over 200 times in the league, as well as on the losing side in the 1894 FA Cup Final.

His elder brother Jim and younger brother Dan were both footballers, the former playing in the 1890 Scottish Cup Final and the latter winning the 1895 Scottish Cup Final and appearing once for Scotland.

References

1869 births
1935 deaths
Date of death missing
Place of death missing
Scottish footballers
English Football League players
Bolton Wanderers F.C. players
Association football wing halves
FA Cup Final players
People from Bonhill
Footballers from West Dunbartonshire
Vale of Leven F.C. players